was a  Japanese film director, most famous for the stylized, folk tale-influenced horror films he made in the 1950s and 1960s.

Career
Born in Kyoto, Nakagawa was early on influenced by proletarian literature and wrote amateur film reviews to the Kinema Junpō film magazine. He joined Makino Film Productions in 1929 as an assistant director and worked under Masahiro Makino. When that studio went bankrupt in 1932, he switched to Utaemon Ichikawa's production company and made his debut as a director in 1934 with Yumiya Hachiman Ken. He later moved to Toho, where he made comedies starring Enoken and even documentaries during the war. It was at Shintoho after the war that he became known for his cinematic adaptations of Japanese kaidan, especially his masterful version of Tokaido Yotsuya kaidan in 1959.

To Western audiences, his most famous film is Jigoku (1960), which he also co-wrote. The film was released on DVD by the Criterion Collection in 2006. 

He also filmed many kaidan for television. His last film was 1982's Kaidan: Ikiteiru Koheiji.

Filmography
(incomplete)
Gekka no Wakamusha (1938)
Itahachi Jima (1938)
Shinpen Tange Sazen: Sekigan no Maki (1939)
Tange Sazen: Sekigan no Maki (1939)
Rinchi (1949)
Shinya no Kokuhaku (1949)
Wakasama Samurai Torimonocho: Nazo no Nomen Yashiki (1950)
Kyo wa Kaisha no Getsuyobi (1952)
Kinsan Torimonocho: Nazo no Ningyoshi (1953)
Shishun no Izumi (1953)
Horafuki Tanji (1954)
Wakaki Hi no Takuboku: Kumo wa Tensai de aru (1954)
Natsume Soseki no Sanshiro (1955)
Ningyo Sashichi Torimonocho Yoen Roku Shibijin (1956)
Kaii Utsunomiya Tsuritenjo (1956)
Koi sugata kitsune goten (1956)
Vampire Moth (Kyuketsuki-ga) (1956)
Kaidan Kasane-ga-fuchi (1957) aka The Depths, aka The Ghost of Kasane Swamp
Borei Kaibyo Yashiki (1958) aka Black Cat Mansion
Dokufu Takahashi Oden (1958)
Kenpei to yurei (1958)
 Kyōen Kobanzame (侠艶小判鮫) - first part is Kyōen Kobanzame zenpen (侠艶小判鮫 前篇) and the second part is Kyōen Kobanzame kōhen (侠艶小判鮫 後篇).
Tokaido Yotsuya kaidan (1959) aka The Ghost of Yotsuya
Nippon Romansu Kyuko (1959)
Onna Kyuketsuki (1959) aka Woman Vampire, Lady Vampire
Onna Shikeishu no Datsugoku (1960) aka Death Row Woman
Jigoku (1960) aka Hell, Sinners of hell
Hatamoto Kenka Taka (1961)
Nendo no Omen Yori: Kaachan (1961)
Inazuma to Uge no Ketto (1962)
Kaidan Hebi-onna (1968) aka Ghost of the Snake Woman
Yoen Dokufuden: Hitokiri Okatsu (1969)
Yoen Dokufuden: Okatsu Kyojo Tabi (1969)
Kaidan: Ikiteiru Koheiji (1982)

References

External links
 
 "Hell on Earth" essay by  Chuck Stephens for The Criterion Collection
 

People from Kyoto
Japanese film directors
Samurai film directors
Horror film directors
1905 births
1984 deaths